Yevgeny Kafelnikov and David Rikl were the defending champions, but did not participate this year.

Trevor Kronemann and David Macpherson won the title, defeating Luis Lobo and Javier Sánchez 6–3, 6–4 in the final.

Seeds

  Grant Connell /  Patrick Galbraith (first round)
  Trevor Kronemann /  David Macpherson (champions)
  Cyril Suk /  Daniel Vacek (first round)
  Gary Muller /  Piet Norval (first round)

Draw

Draw

External links
Draw

1995 BMW Open